AAEM may refer to:

Alkali anion exchange membrane
American Academy of Emergency Medicine
American Academy of Environmental Medicine